The 2017 Patriot League men's basketball tournament was the postseason conference tournament for the Patriot League. It was played February 28, March 2, 5, and 8, 2017 with the higher seed in each matchup hosting at their respective campus sites. Bucknell defeated Lehigh, 81–65, in the championship game to win the Tournament. As a result, Bucknell received the conference's automatic bid to the NCAA tournament.

Seeds
All 10 Patriot League teams were eligible for the tournament. The top six teams received a first round bye. Teams were seeded by record within the conference, with a tiebreaker system to seed teams with identical conference records.

Schedule

Bracket

* indicates overtime period.

References

External links
 2017 Patriot League Men's Basketball Championship

Patriot League men's basketball tournament
Tournament
Patriot League men's basketball tournament
Patriot League men's basketball tournament